Björn Lennart Runge (born 21 June 1961) is a Swedish director and author. He was nominated for The Nordic Council Film Prize in 2006 for Mun mot mun.

Runge was born in Lysekil. He has worked in film since he was 20 and with Roy Andersson, amongst others. He graduated from the Dramatiska Institutet in Stockholm in 1989.

In 1991, he worked on the prizewinning short film Greger Olsson köper en bil, and in 2004, he won a Guldbagge Award for the best directing and script for the film Om jag vänder mig om. The film also won a Blue Angel at the Berlin Film Festival in the same year.

In 2006, he was nominated for The Nordic Council Film Prize for Mun mot mun with the producer Clas Gunnarson. The film deals with a family in crisis when their daughter, Vera, comes home with Morgan, an old criminal. Her father, Mats, fights desperately to win his daughter back.

Runge has directed a number of short films and TV productions.

In 2017, Runge directed the drama film, The Wife starring Glenn Close, Jonathan Pryce, Christian Slater, Annie Starke and Max Irons. For this role, Close won a Golden Globe, a SAG Award, and the Santa Barbara Int Film festival award for Best Leading Actress in 2018, among others. 

In June 2019, Runge was awarded H.M the King's Medal 8th size for "significant contributions as a director and dramatist".

Filmography

Festen, co-directed Lena Koppel 1984
Skymningsjägare 1985
Steward Gustafssons julafton 1985
Brasiliens röda kaffebär 1986
Intill den nya världens kust 1987
Maskinen 1988
Mördaren 1989
Vinden 1989
Vart skall jag fly för ditt ansikte, co-director Jimmy Karlsson 1989
Morgonen 1990
Greger Olsson köper en bil 1990
Ögonblickets barn 1991
En dag på stranden 1994
Sverige in Memorian, co-director Lena Dahlberg 1994
Harry & Sonja 1996
Vulkanmannen 1997
Raymond 1999
Anderssons älskarinna (TV series) 2001
Om jag vänder mig om (Daybreak) 2003
Mun mot mun 2005
Happy End 2011
The Wife 2017

External links

1961 births
Living people
People from Lysekil Municipality
Swedish film directors
Best Director Guldbagge Award winners
Best Screenplay Guldbagge Award winners
Dramatiska Institutet alumni